Raymond Kehm "Ray" Smith (born 23 September 1948) is a former Australian rules footballer who played with Essendon and Melbourne in the Victorian Football League (VFL) during the 1970s. He also played professional rugby league for Fortitude Valley in 1970 and was a part of their premiership-winning team.

Junior football
Smith began playing junior Australian rules football for Sherwood until the age of 14. He then commenced playing senior football for the Western Districts in the QANFL as a 15-year-old while also playing schoolboys rugby union for Brisbane Grammar School in the position of centre. He continued to play both sports throughout his schooling and earned representative honours for the under-19 Queensland rugby union team as well as the Queensland Australian rules football state team.

Australian National Football Council rules at the time stated that New South Wales and Queensland were considered developmental states and would not allow players to switch into the VFL in fear of diminishing the local talent pool. Smith instead decided to sign for the Fortitude Valley Diehards professional rugby league team in the Brisbane Rugby League after impressing in a touch football game.

Rugby league career
In 1970, Smith began playing rugby league for the Fortitude Valley Diehards in the Brisbane Rugby League. He was a part of the Fortitude Valley side that defeated the Northern Suburbs 13–11 in extra time to claim the 1970 BRL premiership. Smith also finished equal first in the 1970 Brisbane Player of the Year award but lost the award on countback. He was seen as a good chance to be chosen for the Australian national rugby league team in 1971 but sent shock waves through rugby league circles when it was announced that he had signed to play for VFL club Essendon in the 1971 season.

VFL career

He moved to Victoria in 1971 and joined Essendon, with whom he would spend five seasons.  A half back flanker, Smith played 91 consecutive games in the period from
1972 to 1976. After playing in the first twelve rounds of the 1975 VFL season for Essendon, he would switch clubs during the week and play the remaining ten rounds at Melbourne. In 1976, when Melbourne defeated Footscray at Western Oval, Smith became the first footballer from Queensland to play 100 VFL games.

Smith finished his career in the Victorian Football Association, where he captain-coached Camberwell in 1977 and 1978. He then played with Brunswick for the season and was a member of their 1980 premiership team.

References

1948 births
Australian rules footballers from Queensland
Essendon Football Club players
Melbourne Football Club players
Western Magpies Australian Football Club players
Camberwell Football Club players
Brunswick Football Club players
Australian rugby league players
Fortitude Valley Diehards players
Australian rugby union players
Footballers who switched code
Living people